Una Harriet Ella Stratford Duval (1879–1975) was a British suffragette and marriage reformer. Her refusal to say "and obey" in her marriage vows made national news.

Early life 
Una was the debutante daughter of Commander Edward Stratford Dugdale and his wife, Harriet Ella Portman, who were both supporters of the suffrage movement. Una was educated at Cheltenham Ladies' College, and later in Hanover and Paris where she studied singing. She was niece of Arthur Peel, 1st Viscount Peel, Speaker of the House of Commons Her parents' household had five servants, and they had a holiday home near Aberdeen.

Activism

Una Dugdale was introduced to the suffrage movement by Frank Rutter. In 1907 she first heard Christabel Pankhurst speaking in Hyde Park and from thence on toured the country with Mrs. Pankhurst raising political awareness and helping her in her work. In 1908 she began working with Helen Fraser in Aberdeen, where she addressed the (predominantly male) fisherfolk in Stonehaven.  And she was pictured at the by-election in Newcastle in 1908 talking to voters (male) aiming to gain their support.

One of her sisters, Marjorie 'Daisy' Dugdale (1884–1973) led the procession to welcome Emmeline and Christabel Pankhurst on their  release from prison on 19 December 1908. On 24 February 1909 Una Dugdale was arrested in Parliament Square during a suffragette "raid" on the House of Commons. She remained in prison for one month.
During 1909–1910 Dugdale joined Mrs. Pankhurst on her two Scottish tours.

Marriage controversy

In 1912 Una Dugdale married Victor Duval. Duval's father, Ernest Charles Augustus Diederichs Duval, a German immigrant of potentially Jewish background, his mother and aunt were also members of the Jewish League for Women Suffrage.

Duval was the founder of The Men’s Political Union for Women’s Enfranchisement; son of Emily Hayes Duval and brother of Elsie Duval - both fellow suffragists. Elsie was the second person to be released under the Prisoners (Temporary Discharge for Ill Health) Act 1913 (the so-called "Cat and Mouse law"), and wife to Hugh Franklin. Duval came from a middle class family, all of whom supported votes for women.

Dugdale sparked a national scandal in 1912 before she married Victor Diederichs Duval (1885–1945), who she had met when he acted as best man at Frank Rutter's wedding. Dugdale said she would refuse to use the word "obey" in her marriage vows, but did so after being advised that its omission could cast doubt on the legality of the marriage. The wedding took place at the Savoy Chapel, her father led her down the aisle and Christabel Pankhurst, Constance Lytton and the Pethick-Lawrences attended dressed in WSPU colours.

The couple went on to have two daughters.

As a response to the scandal, Dugdale (now Mrs. Duval) wrote 'To Love Honour – But Not Obey'.

Ethel Wright art collection

 In 1909 a full length portrait of Christabel Pankhurst by Ethel Wright was exhibited at "The Women's Exhibition" hosted by the Women's Social and Political Union. It was funded by Clara Mordan and held at the Prince's Ice Rink in Knightsbridge in May 1909. Duval bought the painting and itremained in the family until being bequeathed by a descendent of the Duvals to the National Portrait Gallery in 2011, it was first exhibited by them in 2018.

In 1912, the year Una Dugdale married Victor Duval, publishing her pamphlet "Love, Honour and not Obey" she, too, was painted by Ethel Wright. Wright painted a full length portrait of Una Dugdale dressed in bright jade with a background of fierce fighting cocks, entitled "The Music Room". This painting was first shown in London’s Stafford Gallery in the same year  and has remained in the family since, being exhibited as recently as 2020 in Pallant House Gallery, Chichester.

Ethel Wright was also responsible for the portrait which was featured on Una Duval's marriage reform pamphlet.

Suffragette Fellowship

After the First World War, Una Duval co-founded The Suffragette Fellowship, an organisation to preserve the memory of the militant suffrage struggle, of which she was the treasurer.

In the media

On 29 January 1955, Una Duval recorded an interview with John Ellison from the BBC Home Service's In Town Tonight describing how she attempted to storm parliament, was beaten in the street by policemen, and spent time in prison, during the campaign for women's votes.

References

External links
  BBC interview with Una Duval from 1955

People educated at Cheltenham Ladies' College
Women's suffrage in the United Kingdom
1879 births
1975 deaths
Eagle House suffragettes